The Ultimate Collection is the sixth compilation album by the Serbian rock band Električni Orgazam, released as a part of the Ultimate Collection series by Croatia records in 2009. This is the first compilation album to feature a selection of the released material spanning the entire band career. The song selection for the album was given to Miloš Ivanović "Kepa", the music editor of the Radio B92.

Track listing

CD 1

CD 2

Notes

CD 1 
 Tracks 1, 3 and 5 taken from Električni orgazam
 Tracks 2 and 4 taken from Paket aranžman
 Tracks 6, 7, 8 and 9 taken from Lišće prekriva Lisabon
 Tracks 11 and 12 taken from Kako bubanj kaže
 Tracks 13, 14, 15 and 16 taken from Distorzija
 Tracks 17 and 18 taken from Braćo i sestre
 Tracks 19 and 20 taken from Letim, sanjam, dišem
 Track 21 previously unreleased

CD 2 
 Tracks 1 and 2 taken from Seks, droga, nasilje i strah / Balkan Horor Rock
 Tracks 3, 4, 5, 6 and 7 taken from Zašto da ne!
 Tracks 8, 9 and 10 taken from Živo i akustično
 Tracks 11 and 12 taken from A um bum
 Tracks 13 and 14 taken from Harmonajzer
 Track 15 previously unreleased
 Track 16 taken from ElOrgNewWave

References 

 The Ultimate Collection at Rateyourmusic
 The Ultimate Collection at the official site

2009 compilation albums
Električni Orgazam compilation albums